Sun Guozhi (January 1917 – April 21, 2005) was a People's Republic of China politician. He was born in Laiyuan County, Hebei. He was People's Congress Chairman of both his home province and Hunan.

1917 births
2005 deaths
People's Republic of China politicians from Hebei
Chinese Communist Party politicians from Hebei
Political office-holders in Hebei
Political office-holders in Hunan
Governors of Hunan